WRLB (95.3 FM) is an active rock formatted broadcast radio station licensed to Rainelle, West Virginia, serving the Rainelle/Summersville/Lewisburg area.  WRLB is owned and operated by Radio Greenbrier, LLC

External links
Rock 95 WRLB Online

RLB